Fearless is the 9th studio solo album by Contemporary Christian singer Crystal Lewis.

The album was nominated for a Grammy in 2001. Lewis was previously nominated for her contribution to the Kirk Franklin song "Lean On Me" in 1998. Fearless takes a decidedly more mainstream approach to the artists sound, incorporating elements of both electronica and R&B in many of the songs. The album includes the Kirk Franklin-penned "I Still Believe" which previously made its first appearance on a Touched by an Angel Christmas soundtrack album. Most of Fearless features drumwork by Vinnie Colaiuta. The ballad "Trust Me" features background vocals from R&B singer Rahsaan Patterson. Christian rappers T-Bone and J-Raw (of Priesthood) appear on the song "What a Fool I've Been". The song "Only Fools" is a newer version from the original one from the album Remember.

Track listing

Personnel 
 Crystal Lewis – vocals, backing vocals, BGV arrangements
 Jyro Xhan – keyboards, programming 
 Rich Nibble – guitars 
 Tim Pierce – guitars 
 Andy Prickett – guitars 
 Shawn Tubbs – guitars 
 Nathan East – bass 
 Elijah Thompson – bass 
 Vinnie Colaiuta – drums 
 John Andrew Schreiner – string arrangements 
 Wayne Rodrigues – vinyl manipulation 
 Trina Broussard – backing vocals 
 Sherree Ford-Payne – backing vocals 
 Rahsaan Patterson – backing vocals 
 Kirk Franklin – spoken vocals (5),  BGV arrangements
 T-Bone – rap (9)
 J-Raw – rap (9)

Production
 Crystal Lewis – executive producer 
 Brian Ray – producer (1-4, 6-12)
 Kirk Franklin – producer (5)
 Rhett Lawrence – producer (5), mixing 
 Keith Kutcha – engineer 
 Steve MacMillan – engineer, mixing
 Lee Manning – engineer 
 Scott Osborne – engineer 
 Chris Wonzer – engineer 
 Jyro Xhan – engineer 
 Chris Lord-Alge – mixing 
 Dave Pensado – mixing 
 Gavin Lurssen – mastering at The Mastering Lab (Hollywood, California)
 Chris Lizzote – project coordinator 
 Daniel Fairbanks – art direction, layout 
 Sonya Koskoff – photography 
 Garren Tolkin – make-up

References 

Crystal Lewis albums
2000 albums